Toast most commonly refers to:
 Toast (food), bread browned with dry heat
 Toast (honor), a ritual in which a drink is taken

Toast  may also refer to:

Places
 Toast, North Carolina, a census-designated place in the United States

Books
 Toast (play), a 1999 play by Richard Bean
 Toast, a memoir by Nigel Slater
 A Toast (anthem) ("Zdravljica"), a poem by France Prešeren and the Slovenian national anthem
 "A Toast", the title recorded in law for the North Carolina State Toast
 Toast: And Other Rusted Futures, a collection of short fiction by Charles Stross

Film and TV
 Toast (film), 2010 BBC film adaptation of  Nigel Slater's autobiographical novel of the same name
 Toast of London, a British comedy television series
 "Toast" (Space Ghost Coast to Coast), a television episode
 Toasted TV, Australian children's television program
 "Toasted" (Generation), a television episode

Music
 Toasting (Jamaican music), talking or chanting over a rhythm or beat by a deejay

Albums
 Toast (Tar album), 1993
 Toast! (The Arrogant Worms album), 2004
 Toasted (album), by Fatso Jetson
 Toast (Neil Young & Crazy Horse album), a previously unreleased Neil Young album

Songs
 "Toast" (song), by Streetband
 "Toast", a song by Tori Amos on the album The Beekeeper
 "Toast", a song by Heywood Banks
 "Toast", a song by Koffee from Rapture (EP)

Computing and the Internet
 Toast (computing), an informational popup window
 Toast (NHN Entertainment), a web portal for mobile games
 Roxio Toast, a disc authoring and media conversion software program
 The Toast, a feminist general interest site
 Toast, Inc., a cloud-based restaurant software company
 Disguised Toast, sometimes known as Toast, a Canadian streamer, YouTuber, and Internet personality

See also
 Toaster (disambiguation)
 Toasty (disambiguation)
 It's Toasted